The Eparchy of Bratislava is a Slovak Greek Catholic Church ecclesiastical territory or eparchy of the Catholic Church that covers the territory of western and central Slovakia.  It is a suffragan eparchy in the ecclesiastical province of the metropolitan Archeparchy of Prešov. Its cathedral is the Church of the Holy Feast of the Cross in the episcopal see of Bratislava.

The Eparchy of Bratislava covers territory in Bratislava, Trnava, Nitra, Trenčín, Žilina and Banská Bystrica regions (totalling around 33,300 km2).

History
The eparchy was established on 30 January 2008 by Pope Benedict XVI and its current bishop is Peter Rusnák. , roughly 25,000 Slovak Greek Catholics were under the jurisdiction of the Eparchy of Bratislava.

References

Catholic Church in Slovakia
Catholic dioceses in Slovakia
2008 establishments in Europe
Bratislava Region